is a passenger railway station located in the city of Kaizuka, Osaka Prefecture, Japan, operated by the private railway operator Mizuma Railway.

Lines

Layout
The station consists of one side platform serving a single bi-directional track.The station is unattended.

Adjacent stations

History
Koginosato Station opened on June 10, 1969.

Passenger statistics
In fiscal 2019, the station was used by an average of 231 passengers daily.

Surrounding area
 Japan National Route 26
 Osaka Prefectural Road No. 40 Kishiwada Ushitakiyama Shell Mound Line

See also
 List of railway stations in Japan

Reference

External links

  Schedule 

Railway stations in Japan opened in 1969
Railway stations in Osaka Prefecture
Kaizuka, Osaka